Laura Bailey (born 1981) is an American actress.

Laura Bailey may also refer to:

 Laura Bailey (model) (born 1972), English model
 Laura Bailey (footballer) (born 1992), Australian AFL Women's player

See also
 Laura Bayley (1862–1938), British actress and filmmaker